Hendrus Anding is a Malaysian politician who has served as State Assistant Minister of Agriculture, Fisheries and Food Industries of Sabah in the Gabungan Rakyat Sabah (GRS) state administration under Chief Minister Hajiji Noor	and Minister Jeffrey Kitingan since October 2020 as well as Member of the Sabah State Legislative Assembly (MLA) for Tandek since September 2020. He is a member of the United Sabah Party (PBS), a component party of the Gabungan Rakyat Sabah (GRS) coalition. He has also served as the Assistant Secretary-General of PBS since January 2021.

Election results

Honours
  :
  Member of the Order of the Defender of the Realm of Malaysia (AMN) - (2017)

References

Members of the Sabah State Legislative Assembly
United Sabah Party politicians
Living people
Year of birth missing (living people)